The 27th CARIFTA Games was held in Port of Spain, Trinidad and Tobago, on April 11–13, 1998.

Participation (unofficial)

Detailed result lists can be found on the "World Junior Athletics History" website.  An unofficial count yields the number of about 308 athletes (176 junior (under-20) and 132 youth (under-17)) from about 20 countries:  Antigua and Barbuda (10), Bahamas (34), Barbados (41), Bermuda (7), British Virgin Islands (3), Cayman Islands (9), Dominica (4), French Guiana (3), Grenada (11), Guadeloupe (19), Guyana (7), Jamaica (59), Martinique (24), Montserrat (1), Netherlands Antilles (5), Saint Kitts and Nevis (4), Saint Lucia (5), Saint Vincent and the Grenadines (6), Trinidad and Tobago (52), Turks and Caicos Islands (4).

Austin Sealy Award

The Austin Sealy Trophy for the
most outstanding athlete of the games was awarded to Janill Williams from
Antigua and Barbuda.  She was born on September 21, 1985.  At the age of 11 years, she already won the gold medal in the women's 3000 metres competition last year in the junior (U-20) category at the 1997 CARIFTA Games being the youngest athlete to win a medal at the games.  This year at the age of 12 years, she won 2 gold medals,  again the 3000 metres in the junior (U-20) category, and the 1500 metres in the youth (U-17) category.

Medal summary
Medal winners are published by category: Boys under 20 (Junior), Girls under 20 (Junior), Boys under 17 (Youth), and Girls under 17 (Youth).
Complete results can be found on the "World Junior Athletics History"
website.

Boys under 20 (Junior)

Girls under 20 (Junior)

Boys under 17 (Youth)

Girls under 17 (Youth)

Medal table (unofficial)

References

External links
World Junior Athletics History

CARIFTA Games
1998 in Trinidad and Tobago sport
CARIFTA
1998 in Caribbean sport
International athletics competitions hosted by Trinidad and Tobago